

Freight railways by province

National

Multiple provinces

Alberta

British Columbia

Manitoba

New Brunswick

Newfoundland and Labrador

Nova Scotia

Ontario

Quebec

Saskatchewan

Freight railways with trackage rights only

Passenger railways

Urban rail transit

Heritage railways

Defunct railways

Notes and references

See also

List of heritage railways in Canada
List of Ontario railways
Oldest railroads in North America
Rail transport in Canada

External links
Association of American Railroads
American Short Line and Regional Railroad Association
Old Time Trains Histories of Canadian Railways, past and present
CTA  List of companies holding a Certificate of Fitness which is the legal authority to operate a Federal railway
Railway Atlas of Canada PDF route maps of operating railways, by provinces and cities.